Raymond Terczak Jr. (born April 5, 1968) is an American professional stock car racing driver and owner. He last competed in the NASCAR Camping World Truck Series, driving the No. 56 for his family-owned team RHT Motorsports.

Motorsports career results

NASCAR
(key) (Bold – Pole position awarded by qualifying time. Italics – Pole position earned by points standings or practice time. * – Most laps led.)

Camping World Truck Series

References

External links
 
 

1968 births
NASCAR drivers
Living people
People from Stafford, Virginia
Racing drivers from Virginia